Wahneferhotep was an ancient Egyptian king's son who lived in the Thirteenth Dynasty, around 1700 BC. Wahneferhotep is only known from a shabti and model coffin found in the mortuary temple of the pyramid of Senusret I at Lisht, and now at the Metropolitan Museum of Art. On both objects he bears the title king's son. His name means Neferhotep endures. Neferhotep might refer to king Neferhotep I, who was one of the most powerful rulers of the Thirteenth Dynasty; some scholars argue that this king is the most likely ruler that is mentioned in the name. However, the pottery found near the model coffins points to a later date, making it more likely that Neferhotep refers to another, later, king with the same name.

References 

People of the Thirteenth Dynasty of Egypt
Ancient Egyptian princes